bmon is a free and open-source monitoring and debugging tool to monitor bandwidth and capture and display networking-related statistics. It features various output methods including an interactive curses user interface and programmable text output for scripting. bmon allows the user to see:

 Network bandwidth real-time visualization
 Total amount of transmitted data
 CRC errors
 Collisions
 ICMPv6 traffic packets

References

Linux software